Francis Michael Jordan (born February 20, 1935) is an American politician and former police chief, who served as mayor of San Francisco from 1992 to 1996. He is a Democrat.

Early life and education
Jordan was born in San Francisco in 1935 and graduated from Sacred Heart Cathedral Preparatory High School in 1953. He studied political science and government at the University of San Francisco during his time on the police force and graduated in 1975.

Police career and Chief of Police
Before becoming mayor, Jordan served as the Chief of the San Francisco Police Department from 1986 until 1990, at which point he resigned to run for mayor. He joined the force in 1957 and was named Chief of Police by then-Mayor Dianne Feinstein in 1986.

Mayor of San Francisco

Jordan succeeded Art Agnos as the Mayor of San Francisco from 1992, until 1996. Jordan continued Agnos' campaign against the city's chapter of Food Not Bombs and introduced a controversial program called Matrix which aimed to deal with the city's homelessness problems. During his mayoral tenure Jordan played a role in converting the Presidio Army Base into part of the Golden Gate National Recreation Area, bringing Bay Area Rapid Transit to the San Francisco International Airport, keeping the San Francisco Giants in the city and balancing the city's budget.

Jordan was challenged for mayor in the 1995 mayoral election by Willie Brown, who was termed out of the State Assembly. Brown, considered by many to be one of the most powerful African-American politicians in the country, had been defeated only once in a run for public office. Brown and Jordan advanced out of a crowded field to a run-off election, where Brown was victorious. In the 1999 mayoral election, Jordan attempted a comeback bid for Mayor of San Francisco, but came in third place behind Willie Brown and Tom Ammiano.

Foundation executive
Since 2001 Jordan has served as special advisor to the president of the Gordon and Betty Moore Foundation and is the foundation's principal counselor on the impact of potential grants in the nine-county Bay Area. According to the foundation's 2007 annual report, in that year nearly $53 million in grants was devoted to the San Francisco Bay Area.

Personal life
Jordan holds a degree in government and political science from the University of San Francisco, where he has served on the Business Advisory Council since 1989, and teaching credentials from the University of California. As of the October 2017 Northern California wildfires he lived in Santa Rosa with his wife, Wendy Paskin.

References

External links

1935 births
Mayors of San Francisco
San Francisco Police Department chiefs
Living people
University of San Francisco alumni
Democratic Party San Francisco Bay Area politicians
20th-century American politicians